The Mungo River may refer to:

Mungo River, Cameroon
Mungo River, New Zealand

See also 
 Mungo (disambiguation)